, also known as  is a former Japanese politician, former YouTuber and former businessman. He was elected into the House of Councillors in 2022 as part of the NHK Party, but was expelled on March 15, 2023, for not attending any sessions of Parliament. The following day, the Tokyo Metropolitan Police Department sought an arrest warrant for alleged defamation of celebrities in his YouTube videos.

Career 
GaaSyy rose to prominence in 2022 after starting a YouTube channel where he spoke about alleged scandals in the entertainment industry. His channel gained 1.3 million subscribers before being shut down in July of that year. His success led to Takashi Tachibana, the leader of the fringe NHK Party that focuses on reforms to the Japanese public broadcaster, to recruit him for the 2022 Japanese House of Councillors election. GaaSyy's platform included a pledge to work from overseas, and won election with over 287,000 votes.

As of July 2022, he lives in Dubai, the United Arab Emirates. In August 2022 he skipped what would have been his first day as a lawmaker because he feared arrest, on grounds of alleged fraud and defamation against celebrities, if he came to Japan. GaaSyy skipped all future House of Councillors sessions, instead continuing to post on his social media channels.

In January 2023, locations linked to GaaSyy and his advertising revenue management company were raided by police to investigate alleged defamation and intimidation of celebrities as well as obstruction of business. The Tokyo Metropolitan Police Department also requested GaaSyy appear for an interview.

In February 2023, GaaSyy was asked by the House of Councillors to fly to Tokyo and deliver an in-person apology for his continued absence during an open session, the penultimate disciplinary step before expulsion. GaaSyy initially promised to do so, but backtracked, citing fear of prosecution despite sitting parliamentarians in Japan having immunity from prosecution. HIs reversal lead to party leader Tachibana resigning in favour of actress Ayaka Otsu. GaaSyy istead posted a video about going to Gaziantep, Turkey to help in the recovery efforts after the February 2023 earthquake. 

The disciplinary committee of the House of Councillors voted to expel him on March 14, which was made official by the whole body the following day. The final expulsion vote passed 235-1, with the only "no" vote being his fellow party member, Satoshi Hamada. The expulsion was the first in over 70 years, and the first ever instance of expulsion for non-attendance. After the expulsion vote, party leader Ayaka Otsu expressed disappointment, noting that he had openly campaigned on working from abroad, so his constituents would not be upset by remote work.

The expulsion meant that GaaSyy no longer had immunity from prosecution afforded to parliamentarians while parliament was in session.  On March 16, 2023, Tokyo Metropolitan Police Department requested an arrest warrant for GaaSyy over alleged defamation in his social media videos, as well as for his editor. It also requested that the Ministry of Foreign Affairs demand the return of GaaSyy's passport.

References

External links 
 
 

1971 births
Living people
20th-century Japanese businesspeople
21st-century Japanese businesspeople
Japanese producers
Talent managers
Japanese YouTubers
Japanese whistleblowers
TikTokers
Members of the House of Councillors (Japan)
Japanese expatriates in the United Arab Emirates
Politicians from Hyōgo Prefecture
People expelled from public office